Alan Page Fiske (born 1947) is an American professor of anthropology at the University of California, Los Angeles, known for studying the nature of human relationships and cross-cultural variations between them.

Early life
Fiske was born in 1947. His father, Donald W. Fiske, was a professor of psychology at the University of Chicago. His sister, Susan Fiske, is a social psychologist and Eugene Higgins Professor of Psychology and Public Affairs at the Princeton University Department of Psychology.

Fiske earned a bachelor's degree (Cum Laude) in Social Relations from Harvard College in 1968. He went on to earn a master's degree in 1973 and a PhD in 1985, both from the University of Chicago, focusing on cross-cultural problems and human development.

Career
Between earning degrees, Fiske worked as a director and consultant to the Peace Corps in Bangladesh and Upper Volta, and as consultant to USAID for the Central African Republic.

Fiske held various professorships at the University of Pennsylvania, UCSD, Swarthmore College, and Bryn Mawr College, before obtaining a full professorship at UCLA in 2002. There he is former director of the Center for Behavior, Evolution, and Culture, and of the Center for Culture, Brain, and Development. His areas of research interest include psychological anthropology, social relationships, and theories of violence. Fiske is the author of Relational Models Theory and, with Tage Rai, the author of Virtuous Violence Theory - the idea that violence is largely motivated by the evolved social relations models which underlie moral behavior in Fiske's theory, and that this violence is therefore experienced as justified by the perpetrators in the same way that forceful opposition to perpetrators of violence is perceived as laudable and moral.

Publications
 Virtuous Violence (2015). Cambridge: Cambridge University Press.
 Structures of Social Life: The Four Elementary Forms of Human Relations (1991). New York: Free Press (Macmillan).
 
 
 A.P. Fiske, S. Kitayama, H. Markus, & D. Nisbett 1997. "The Cultural Matrix of Social Psychology". In Handbook of Social Psychology, 4th Ed. Gilber, S. Fiske, & G. Lindzey, Eds. pp. 915–981. New York: McGraw Hill.
 
 
 "Four Modes of Constituting Relationships: Consubstantial Assimilation; Space, Magnitude, Time and Force; Concrete Procedures; Abstract Symbolism" (2004) In N. Haslam, Ed., Relational Models Theory: A Contemporary Overview. Mahwah, NJ: Erlbaum.

References

Living people
American anthropologists
American anthropology writers
American male non-fiction writers
Anthropology educators
University of California, Los Angeles faculty
Writers from California
Cultural anthropologists
Harvard College alumni
University of Chicago alumni
1947 births